Tom Murday (born 24 April 1989) is an Australian rugby union footballer. He is currently signed to the French club  Agen and previously played for the Queensland Reds in the Super Rugby competition. His usual position is lock, however he can also play in the backrow.

Early life
Murday was raised in Mossman in North Queensland, and he played junior club rugby for the Port Douglas Reef Raiders as a teenager. He attended Brisbane Grammar School and played for the Australian Schoolboys rugby team in 2006.

Career
Murday was selected for the Australia U20 team that played in the 2008 IRB Junior World Championship in Wales. He joined the RugbyWA Academy later that season and toured to the UK with the Force development side.

In 2009 and 2010 Murday played with Sunnybank in the Queensland Premier Rugby competition. He moved to the ACT to play for the Tuggeranong Vikings rugby club in 2011 and was selected for the Brumby Runners team that played in the 2012 Pacific Rugby Cup.

He was also a member of the  extended squad, and won the World Club 10s title with the Auckland team in 2014.

Murday signed a two-year deal with French club SU Agen Lot-et-Garonne in mid-2015.

References

External links
itsrugby.co.uk profile

1989 births
Australian rugby union players
Queensland Reds players
Northland rugby union players
SU Agen Lot-et-Garonne players
Rugby union locks
Living people
Australian expatriate rugby union players
Australian expatriate sportspeople in France
Expatriate rugby union players in France
Rugby union players from Queensland